Select Bus Service (SBS; stylized as +selectbusservice) is a brand used by the Metropolitan Transportation Authority (MTA)'s Regional Bus Operations for limited-stop bus routes with some bus rapid transit features in New York City. The first SBS route was implemented in 2008 in order to improve speed and reliability on long, busy corridors.

SBS routes use vehicle-segregated, camera-enforced bus lanes; sidewalk extensions for bus stops; relatively long distances between stops; vehicular turn restrictions along corridors; and next-bus travel information screens. Twenty more routes are proposed through 2027. However, in summer 2018, the MTA announced that it was considering delaying the implementation of SBS routes outside Manhattan until 2021 because of the city's upcoming bus-network redesign.

History

Context 
In 2002, Schaller Consulting conducted a study on potential bus rapid transit services in New York City. In 2004, the MTA in conjunction with the New York City Department of Transportation and New York State Department of Transportation, performed an initial study on bus rapid transit, with 80 corridors studied citywide. In late 2004, the MTA identified five corridors for implementation of bus rapid transit, one in each of the five boroughs: the Fordham Road/Pelham Parkway corridor in the Bronx, First Avenue and Second Avenue in Manhattan, Merrick Boulevard in Queens, Nostrand Avenue in Brooklyn, and Hylan Boulevard in Staten Island. Four bus priority corridors were also identified for implementation or expansion (three in Manhattan, one in the Bronx): Madison Avenue (expansion), Fifth Avenue, 34th Street, and Webster Avenue. The Merrick Boulevard corridor was eventually scrapped because of community opposition related to loss of parking. However, the corridor is being considered again as part of the Bus Forward study in 2017.

The Select Bus Service program was unveiled to the public on March 25, 2008. At the time of the announcement, the MTA and then-Mayor Michael Bloomberg had stated that implementation on other corridors was contingent on the passage of congestion pricing, which ultimately did not make it for a vote in the legislature.

Key features of bus rapid transit include dedicated lanes, alignment of lanes to reduce conflicts with other vehicles, frequent service, off-vehicle fare collection, sheltered stations, platform-level boarding, and intelligent transportation systems (ITS) features such as transit signal priority. A 2011 study by the Institute for Transportation and Development Policy (ITDP) determined that the SBS system was best classified as "Not BRT" because it lacked many of these BRT Standard features.

Corridors 
 The first Select Bus Service corridor, on the Bx12 along 207th Street, Fordham Road, and Pelham Parkway, was placed into service on June 29, 2008. The next line, the M15, saw Select Service begin on October 10, 2010 after the delivery of new low-floor buses. The M34/M34A line was started on November 13, 2011. Initially, a 34th Street busway was planned that would require eliminating 34th Street as a through street, but it was dropped in favor of the standard SBS model. The B44 Rogers/Bedford/Nostrand Avenues bus route, the fifth Select Bus Service corridor in the city, was implemented on November 17, 2013 after the arrival of new fare machines. The S79 Hylan Boulevard/Richmond Avenue route, initially slated to be converted to SBS in 2013, was moved up to September 2, 2012; the local equivalents of the S79 route are the S78 and S59 buses. A sixth corridor, the second for the Bronx, began service on the Bx41 Webster Avenue route on June 30, 2013; this route was the first "Phase II" SBS route to begin service (the existing corridors plus the B44 comprise Phase I). Another Select Bus Service route on Webster Avenue, which will be extended to run between LaGuardia Airport and Fordham Plaza alongside the local Bx41 route, is proposed for later implementation.

A seventh corridor, and the third for Manhattan, the M60 125th Street–Triborough Bridge–Astoria Boulevard bus route to LaGuardia Airport, was converted to SBS on May 25, 2014; local service was replaced by other routes running alongside the route of the M60 (the M100, M101, Bx15, and Q19). An eighth Select Bus Service route was planned in the 2014–2017 Financial Plan. The eighth Select Bus Service corridor (ninth route overall), and the fourth in Manhattan, was for the M86 running on 86th Street, which was originally scheduled to start running on June 28, 2015, but pushed back to July 13, 2015; it did not include a major change in stops.

The ninth corridor, and the second for Brooklyn, is the B46 on Utica Avenue. When implemented, the local and Select Bus Service route of the B46 changed northern terminals to improve reliability. Originally planned for implementation in fall 2015, it was instituted on July 3, 2016. The tenth corridor, and the first for Queens, is the Q44 limited bus route running on East 177th Street (the Cross Bronx Expressway service road) and Main Street, which began on November 29, 2015. Selected stops in the Bronx were combined into much busier stops for faster service, and some stops in Queens have been replaced by the Q20A/B local routes. As both the Q20 branches do not enter the Bronx and the Q44 ran local late nights only, the Q44 gained 24/7 SBS service between the Bronx Zoo and Jamaica. The Q20A replaced the Q44 local in Queens late nights.

On September 25, 2016, the eleventh corridor (twelfth route overall) and the second for Queens, the Q70, was rebranded as the "LaGuardia Link" and became a SBS route. As opposed to other SBS routes, the Q70 is wrapped in a light blue scheme with clouds and airplanes in order to encourage more people to use public transportation when using the airport. This marked MTA Bus's first SBS route, as well as the second for Queens and the eleventh overall. The M23, the twelfth corridor (thirteenth route) and the fifth in Manhattan, became a Select Bus Service route on November 6, 2016 with dedicated bus lanes and countdown clocks at some stops, replacing M23 local service at the cost of $1.7 million. The M79 became an SBS route on May 21, 2017, with the installation of bus lanes along its route. The Bx6, after the completion of bus lanes and widened sidewalks, became an SBS route on September 3, 2017. It supplements the local service by stopping at high ridership stops. This is the third route for the Bronx. Select Bus Service along Woodhaven and Cross Bay Boulevards was implemented on the Q52 and Q53 routes on November 12, 2017.

Select Bus Service along Kings Highway was implemented on the B82, which replaced the former Limited-Stop route, on October 1, 2018. The city subsequently announced that following the implementation of the B82 SBS, it would halt the implementation of Select Bus Service in the outer boroughs until 2021 as a result of budget cuts, and an upcoming redesign of the city's bus network.

A temporary M14 Select Bus Service route was proposed for implementation in early 2019, in preparation for the 14th Street Tunnel shutdown. This route would have run between Tenth Avenue and Stuyvesant Cove Ferry, with local service on the M14A and M14D. Five additional temporary routes would have been implemented for the shutdown in April 2019. However, on January 3, 2019, the shutdown plan was altered by Governor Andrew Cuomo and the proposed SBS routes were put on hold. In February 2019, the MTA announced plans to implement SBS on the M14A and M14D, and has since been implemented on July 1, 2019.

All current SBS corridors are enforced by cameras restricting non-buses in these lanes on weekdays where the bus lane is curbside, with the bus lanes marked by red paint. Where the bus lane is an offset lane (that is, one lane away from the curb), non-bus traffic is restricted at all times except for emergencies.

Current routes 
Currently, SBS operates twenty different bus lines on seventeen different corridors. 

By order of implementation, SBS was placed on the Bx12, M15, M34, M34A, S79, Bx41, B44, M60, M86, Q44, B46, Q70, M23, M79, Bx6, Q52, Q53, B82, M14A, and M14D routes. 

SBS replaced nearly-identical limited-stop service on the Bx12, M15, Bx41, B44, Q44, B46, Q70, Q52, Q53, and B82 where corresponding local bus service still operates (except on the Q44, whose nighttime local variant was eliminated and replaced with the full-time SBS route, and the Q70, which had no local equivalent before the conversion). The Bx6 SBS was split from the Bx6 local, which had no limited-stop variant prior to SBS implementation on that route. The B46 SBS omitted the Broadway section of the LTD route, while the B82 SBS did not replace service along the original B82 LTD portion between Bay 37th St and Coney Island. For the other routes, all service was converted from local to SBS, and numerous local stops were combined or omitted. The Bx12, M15, M34, M34A, S79, Bx41, B44, B46, Bx6, and Q52 routes run the whole day, while the M60, M86, Q44, Q70, M23, M79, Q53, M14A, and M14D routes run at all times. The B82 is the first and only SBS line to not run on late nights and weekends.

Bx12 

The Bx12 Limited was the first route to be converted into a Select Bus Service line, the Bx12 SBS. It was placed into service on June 29, 2008 replacing limited stop service with SBS on this line. Both Bx12 Select Bus Service and Bx12 local are based out of the Gun Hill Bus Depot. During late nights, the corridor is served by the Bx12 local service, which operates 24/7.

M15 

The M15 Limited became the M15 SBS on October 10, 2010, which replaced limited stop service with SBS on this line.

Southbound transfers from the M15 SBS require walking south to the corresponding streets and vice versa. Originally based out of the 126th Street Bus Depot, since January 2015, M15 Select Bus Service is based out of the Mother Clara Hale Bus Depot, while the M15 local is based out of the Tuskegee Airmen Bus Depot.

M34 and M34A 

The M34 SBS and M34A SBS routes began on November 13, 2011. These are considered by the MTA as two SBS services, the M34 34th Street Crosstown and the former M16 route, which was renamed the M34A; the routes share a single corridor.  Originally, a provision of this corridor was planned to create a special "Busway" which would have seen both the M34 and M34A SBS lines run along 34th Street in a special two-lane corridor with vehicular traffic traveling in only one direction (westbound after 6th Avenue/Broadway; eastbound after 5th Avenue), this was eventually scrapped and replaced with curbside and offset bus lanes along 34th Street with bus bulbs at selected bus stops. The stops are listed below from west to east. Alternate M34 SBS trips began originating/terminating at Waterside Plaza with the M34A SBS on September 3, 2017.

This service used non-articulated Orion 7 hybrid-electric buses between November 2011 and early April 2013, when they were replaced by the articulated buses found on the majority of the other SBS routes. The M34 and M34A are both based in the Michael J. Quill Bus Depot.

S79 

The S79 SBS route began on September 2, 2012. While the routing was left mostly intact, the S79 had all local service eliminated and replaced by local service on the S59 route along Richmond Avenue and the S78 route along Hylan Boulevard. The route was also straightened through New Springville to bypass the Yukon Bus Depot. This route uses rigid 40-foot Nova LFS diesel buses, and is the only SBS line that does not utilize off-board fare collection. Additionally, it was the only SBS line in the 5 boroughs that did not use 60-foot articulated buses before the B46 SBS was introduced as well as the only SBS line to not have blue destination signs until July 2017. Riders must pay the fare on board, as they do on local, limited-stop, and express buses. The S79 Select Bus Service is based out of the Yukon Bus Depot.

Northbound is towards Brooklyn and southbound is towards Staten Island.

Bx41 

The Bx41 Limited, running along Webster Avenue and Melrose Avenue in the Bronx, was the first route to be converted into a Phase II Select Bus Service line. The Bx41 SBS began service on June 30, 2013. The stops are nearly identical to the limited service it replaced, and service was expanded from peak hours to seven days a week. The stops are listed from south to north below. Both Bx41 Select Bus Service and Bx41 were originally based out of the Kingsbridge Bus Depot. However, on January 8, 2017, the line was moved to Gun Hill Depot from Kingsbridge Depot to ease the pressure relieve the severe overcrowding at the Kingsbridge Bus Depot.

B44 

The B44 SBS route began on November 17, 2013, replacing the B44 Limited service with Select Bus Service. Initially planned for the end of 2011, then later the summer of 2012, the start date was pushed to November 2013 as the buses for the service did not arrive until early 2013. Unlike other SBS routes, this service involved a significant change in route, and approximately 20 limited stops were eliminated. The elimination of the Avenue L stop, located adjacent to a school, from the SBS route, was controversial, with local elected representatives and community members starting a petition and calling for its restoration. On February 11, 2014, just under three months since its launch, the MTA conceded to community pressure and added Avenue L and Gates Avenue to the SBS route. This bus is based out of the Flatbush Bus Depot. Stops are listed from south to north.

M60 

The M60 operates between the Upper West Side of Manhattan and LaGuardia Airport, providing crosstown service along 125th Street in Harlem. Select Bus Service was originally scheduled to begin in mid or late 2013, but was pushed to May 25, 2014 due to community opposition, citing loss of available parking spaces along 125th Street in Manhattan. Due to its status as an airport connector, buses on the route are equipped with luggage racks.

The M60 was based out of 126th Street Depot upon implementation as a Select Bus Service route. In January 2015, the M60 moved to the Michael J. Quill Bus Depot (where most Manhattan crosstown routes are based out of) due to the closing of the 126th Street Depot. The stops are listed below, west to east; stops at the eastern end of the route, within LaGuardia Airport, are marked "Airport Stop".

M86 

The M86 bus, running crosstown along 86th Street in Manhattan, was identified as a potential bus rapid transit corridor in 2009. The M86 SBS route debuted on July 13, 2015. It was the fourth corridor in Manhattan and the fifth Manhattan bus line to have Select Bus Service. The M86 SBS was based out of the Tuskegee Airmen Depot, but was switched to the Michael J. Quill Depot on January 7, 2018.

Q44 

In 2015, the Main Street corridor, along with the parallel Kissena/Parsons Boulevards corridor and the 164th Street corridor, was studied by the NYC Department of Transportation for the implementation of SBS between Flushing and Jamaica, Queens. The Q44 Limited route, which formerly made limited stops only during the day, was planned for conversion into a full-time bus rapid transit line, with local service continuing to be provided by the parallel Q20A/B services.

The Q44 SBS was approved in June 2015, with no changes from the original routing, which runs between Queens and the Bronx. Due to community opposition, bus lanes were only installed on a small portion of the route between Roosevelt Avenue and the Long Island Expressway in Downtown Flushing and Queensboro Hill, and on Archer Avenue and Sutphin Boulevard in Jamaica; portions of the Archer Avenue lanes were installed before the implementation of SBS. The route began service on November 29, 2015. The Q44 is the first Q-prefixed route to have Select Bus Service, which replaces both the Q44 late-night local and daytime limited-stop buses; local bus service in Queens is provided by the Q20A/B, while there is no local equivalent in the Bronx. The Q20A/B and the Q44 SBS are based out of the Casey Stengel Depot.

B46 

The B46 line is the busiest bus route in Brooklyn and 3rd busiest in the entire city. Select Bus Service began July 3, 2016, after being originally scheduled for a fall 2015 implementation. The B46 SBS replaced the B46 Limited, making similar stops along Utica Avenue and Malcolm X Boulevard. Unlike the former Limited, the B46 SBS makes limited stops south of Avenue H, and only runs between Kings Plaza and DeKalb Avenue. The B46 local was extended along Broadway to replace limited-stop service to the Williamsburg Bridge Plaza Bus Terminal at all times. Both the B46 local and Select Bus Service are based out of the Flatbush Bus Depot, as is the B44 SBS. The B46 is the second Select Bus Service in Brooklyn, and the first one to not operate during late nights since the B44 in November 2013.

Q70

In Queens, the Q70 limited-stop bus between Woodside and LaGuardia Airport via the Roosevelt Avenue/74th Street subway station was implemented in September 2013, replacing the portion of the Q33 local bus that went to LaGuardia Airport. Although the Q70 was intended as a bus rapid transit project, it had yet to be branded as Select Bus Service and did not employ most SBS elements, as it lacked ticket machines, all-door boarding, branded buses, and dedicated bus lanes. The Q70 SBS was implemented on September 25, 2016, when it was rebranded as the "LaGuardia Link" with the implementation of off-board payment of fares. As opposed to other SBS routes, the Q70 is wrapped in a light blue scheme with clouds and airplanes on the top half of the bus imposed with the standard SBS livery on the lower half. No fares have been charged since May 2022. 

The Q70, based out of LaGuardia Depot, is the second Queens bus line to have Select Bus Service and the first one for MTA Bus.

M23

The M23 route has been traditionally crowded, with 4,862,343 riders in 2010 and 3,831,755 riders in 2015, or 15,000 riders a day. In 2009, the MTA and the New York City Department of Transportation (NYCDOT) identified the M14A/D, on parallel 14th Street, as a potential corridor for Phase II of SBS, the city's bus rapid transit system, as well as finalized plans to implement SBS on the M16/M34 along the also-parallel 34th Street. The crosstown bus corridors were noted for slow travel speeds. The M23 was originally not planned to be an SBS route, but in 2008, it had been part of a pilot program in which 30 articulated, redesigned SBS buses were rolled out on the M23 for some time.

After lengthy consultation, the M23 was converted to SBS on November 6, 2016, replacing the identical local counterpart bus line. Unlike the former local line, the westbound stop on 5th Avenue and two bi-directional stops on Lexington Avenue are not served by this line. The M23 is based out of the Michael J. Quill Bus Depot. The M23 is the fifth corridor in Manhattan and the sixth Manhattan bus line to have Select Bus Service.

M79

The M79 local bus route was identified as a heavily traveled corridor in a 2009 study by the DOT and NYCTA, and in a December 2013 study by the Pratt Center for Community Development of Brooklyn. It was converted to SBS on May 21, 2017.

Bx6

On September 3, 2017, the Bx6 SBS service was split from the existing Bx6 local service. The Bx6 SBS initially operated a similar route to the local, but the eastbound SBS route followed the westbound local route instead of exiting the Macombs Dam Bridge to Jerome Avenue. The Bx6 SBS supplements the existing Bx6 local service, making stops at select high-ridership locations and all transfers points to Metro-North and subways. In late 2019, it was announced that the Bx6 SBS route's eastern terminus would be relocated from Hunts Point to Soundview, along the path of the Bx5 route, with the change set to take effect in the summer of 2023 once MetroCard has been retired.

The Bx6 SBS is based out of the West Farms Bus Depot, as is the Bx6 local. It is also the third Bronx Bus line to have Select Bus Service and the first one since the Bx41 on June 30, 2013. It is also the first SBS to run a full CNG Fleet. The Bx6 is also the MTA's 15th Select Bus Service line to date.

The Bx6 corridor is the first to use bus lanes in the median of the street at the E 161st Street/Sheridan-Sherman Avenues stops, as opposed to curbside or offset bus lanes. The median bus lanes supposedly speeds up traffic by going around double-parked cars. Originally, a similar provision of median bus lanes was planned for the 34th Street Corridor in Manhattan. A planned "Busway" would have seen both the M34 and M34A SBS lines run along 34th Street in a special two-lane corridor with vehicular traffic travelling in only one direction (westbound after 6th Avenue/Broadway; eastbound after 5th Avenue), this was eventually scrapped and replaced with curbside and offset bus lanes along 34th Street with bus bulbs at selected bus stops (see above).

Q52 and Q53 

The Q52 and Q53 buses were converted to Select Bus Lines on November 12, 2017. The Q52 SBS is based out of the JFK Depot, while the Q53 SBS is based out of the LaGuardia Depot. They are also the 3rd and 4th Queens bus lines to be converted into Select Bus Service (the 2nd and 3rd bus lines of MTA Bus).

B82

The B82 Limited was converted to Select Bus Service on October 1, 2018. The B82 SBS however did not replace limited service between Bay 37th St and Coney Island. The B82 is the 3rd Brooklyn bus line (the MTA's 18th) to have Select Bus Service, and the only SBS line to run on weekdays only. Service on late nights and weekends is provided by the B82 local. The B82 SBS is based out of the East New York Depot.

M14A and M14D

A temporary M14 Select Bus Service route was scheduled to be implemented on January 6, 2019, in preparation for the full 14th Street Tunnel shutdown. However, following the alteration in the 14th Street Tunnel rehabilitation plans in January 2019, the M14 SBS was put on hold. Later, it was announced that the M14A/D routes themselves would be converted to SBS, replacing their former local versions. The M14A/D SBS routes were implemented on July 1, 2019. These are the first Bus routes to take advantage of an Exclusive 14th Street Busway that went into effect on October 2, 2019.  Both the M14A and M14D are based out of Michael J. Quill Bus Depot and are also both the 8th and 9th Manhattan bus lines (the MTA's 19th and 20th) to have Select Bus Service, respectively.

Future routes
Other Select Bus Service routes are planned for the near future as part of the continuation of Phase II, including neighborhoods underserved by rapid transit and heavily used express bus routes. These were identified during a 2009 study by the DOT and MTA, in a December 2013 study by the Pratt Center for Community Development of Brooklyn, and in a 2017 by the DOT and MTA. Twenty-one routes are expected to be added to the SBS system between October 2017 and 2027.

Corridors chosen for implementation
The M96 was set to become the next route to be converted to Select Bus Service after the M14, with implementation set for 2019, but was pushed back due to budget constraints. Bus lanes will be added to 96th Street, bus stops will be consolidated and signal timing will be changed along the street as part of the Better Buses Action Plan, which was unveiled on April 19, 2019, making it one of the next corridors to become SBS. The MTA bus network redesign's route type distribution has a new route type called "Crosstown/SBS", which all current SBS routes fall under. The MTA is planning to upgrade some existing routes into the route type (B41, Q50) and create some new ones (B55 (current B35 Limited, but extended to JFK Airport), Q51, Q98).

The Q25 or Q34 Limited, running primarily along Parsons and Kissena Boulevards in Queens, has been proposed for conversion to Select Bus Service. The corridor was one of the possible future corridors identified in the 2017 announcement about the SBS system's expansion. Other potential routes such as the B41 have undergone preliminary studies and community outreach, but have yet to be considered for implementation.

Potential corridors
Below are potential corridors and neighborhoods listed under the 2009 study, current Phase II plans that have not already been implemented, and from the 2017 study. As of Spring 2019, all future proposals, except for the North Shore BRT study, have been postponed, while awaiting the Bus System Redesign.

Corridors and Neighborhoods include:
 Middle Village (current )
 Jamaica / Hillside Avenue Corridor (current )
 Southeast Queens (current Q4, Q5, Q85, and Q84 routes)
 Southeast Queens (current  routes)
 Union Turnpike (current  route)
 Flatbush Avenue Corridor (current )
 Multiple Southern Brooklyn East-West Corridors (current B6 and B82): B82 implemented on October 1, 2018.
 Manhattan West Side – Amsterdam Avenue/135th Street to Hudson Street/8th Avenue (current )
 Broadway to Central Bronx (current )
 University Avenue (current )
 Tremont Avenue (current  routes)
 Harlem to Southern Boulevard (current )
 Soundview to Washington Heights (current )
 96th Street Crosstown (current ); planned 
 Church Avenue (current )
 Ridgewood to Flushing (current )
 Flushing to Cambria Heights via Springfield Boulevard (current )
 Queens Access to JFK (current )
 The Hub to Fordham Plaza (current )
 Gun Hill Road Corridor (current ); Bx28 proposed for future conversion
 Bedford Park to Co-Op City (current )
 Seagate to Sheepshead Bay (current )

High-volume express bus corridors include:
 Major Deegan Expressway (I-87)
 Bruckner Expressway (I-278)
 Long Island Expressway (I-495)
 Gowanus Expressway (I-278)
 Staten Island Expressway (I-278)

"Difficult trips", trips that are difficult to make and/or require many transfers, as identified by the MTA:
 14th Street Crosstown Corridor – 23rd Street/11th Avenue to Grand Street/Avenue D (current M14A/M14D); implemented July 1, 2019.
 Jamaica to Flushing Corridor: Q25 Limited is proposed for future conversion.
 Bushwick to Downtown Brooklyn Corridor (current B38 and B54)
 Central Brooklyn East-West Corridor
 Southern Brooklyn East-West Corridor – Bay Ridge to JFK Airport (current B6, and B82 routes)
 Northern Boulevard Flushing – Manhattan Corridor via Queensboro Bridge: Q66 is proposed for future conversion.

The following subway lines have been flagged for being at or above 95% of New York City Subway loading guidelines during rush hours:
 Broadway–Seventh Avenue 
 Lexington Avenue 
 Queens-Manhattan connections: 7, E, N, and W trains

Areas that are undergoing or may undergo significant growth in housing units and that have limited transit access:
 South Bronx: Bx6 SBS was implemented on September 3, 2017.
 Queens East River waterfront
 Brooklyn East River waterfront
 Western Shore/Southern Shore (Charleston, Tottenville) of Staten Island

Additional Study Areas include:
 North Shore of Staten Island (Current S40 and S90 routes; former North Shore Branch of Staten Island Railway); being studied by the MTA

There are also "tiered" corridors based on importance, identified in the Pratt Center report in December 2013 and a previous report from 2007.

"First-tiered" corridors:
 LaGuardia–Woodhaven/Cross Bay–Rockaway (Queens); Combination of current Q72 and Q52/Q53 routes.
 Q52/Q53 LTD (Woodhaven & Cross Bay Boulevards) converted on November 12, 2017.
 North Shore (Staten Island); Current S40, S90 routes; former North Shore Branch of Staten Island Railway
 Industry City/Sunset Park–Linden–JFK (Brooklyn–Queens); B35 route and eastern portion of the B15 route (proposed as B55 SBS in Brooklyn bus redesign, but ends in Kensington instead of Sunset Park).

"Second-tiered" corridors:
 Far Rockaway–Jamaica (Queens); Current Q113 and Q114 routes
 Bush Terminal/Sunset Park–JFK via Southeast Brooklyn (Brooklyn–Queens)
 East Bronx hospital cluster–East Harlem (Bronx–Manhattan)
 Mid-Staten Island–Hudson County, NJ–Holland Tunnel–Manhattan (Staten Island–New Jersey–Manhattan)

Fare and payment 

The fare for SBS is the same as on all New York City Transit local and limited-stop buses, $2.75, payable with a MetroCard or coins at booths on each stop. The Fare can also be paid on board SBS Buses with MTA's new OMNY Fare Payment system, by tapping a contactless bank card, smart device or OMNY Card at any OMNY Reader at any door, excluding the S79 SBS. Boarding procedures for the S79 SBS are the same as those on regular local and limited-stop buses using Metrocard or OMNY on the Front Door of the Bus. On all other SBS services, unlike other bus lines in New York City, fare collection for SBS uses a proof-of-payment system. Passengers are required to pay their fare before boarding the bus at pay stations located in bus shelters at the designated stops (for customers using UniTicket, which is valid for boarding) or paying the Fare on board at any door using OMNY. Once fare payment is made, one must board the bus at that stop within one hour. Boarding can be done via any of the two or three doors (depending on the bus fleet), except on S79 buses, where all passengers board from the front door since fares are paid on board. New York City Transit fare inspectors (organized in "EAGLE" teams), NYPD officers, or MTA police officers check for proof of payment receipts, OMNY Users will have their payment method validated with a reader carried by the "EAGLE" Team to ensure Proof of Payment; those unable to produce one are subject to a fine of up to $100. These inspections are conducted randomly, or through the entire bus at specific stations.

In addition, proof-of-payment receipts are only valid for the route that stops at the station at which one boards (i.e., an M34/M34A SBS receipt cannot be used on the M15 SBS). When transferring from one SBS route to another, one must obtain a second receipt from that route's fare payment machines, OMNY users must tap the same payment method on their next leg of their trip to obtain their Free transfer. Free transfers between routes are also provided with MetroCards and OMNY.

Fare machines 

Select Bus Service fare machines consist of modified versions of existing MTA and DOT devices. MetroCard payment utilizes MetroCard Fare Collection Machines, similar in design to ATM/Debit Card MetroCard vending machines (known as MetroCard Express Machines) used in the New York City Subway, but without touch screens. Coin payment utilizes a modified Parkeon Muni Meter. The original machines used on the Bx12 in 2008 consisted of re-purposed versions of MetroCard Express Machines and first-generation Parkeon multi-space devices, which have since been replaced.

Select Bus Service routes as of July 20, 2020 in Manhattan, October 13, 2020 in the Bronx and in Queens & Brooklyn, since December 31, 2020 have had OMNY Readers just as Local Buses mounted on each door where riders can tap their contactless cards, smart devices or OMNY Cards to pay the Fare.

Fleet 

Select Bus Service buses are wrapped in a unique blue paint scheme that identifies them as operating in this particular service. Older buses are painted mostly white, with a blue stripe just below the windows and a teal pattern with plus signs and "+selectbusservice" logos. In March 2016, a new gold-and-blue livery was introduced across the entire MTA fleet. SBS buses delivered after March 2016 have a variation of this livery, with the teal pattern below the windows and the new gold and blue livery above. On the buses with 2016 livery, the Select Bus Service logo is located at the front and sides the bus. The bottom of LaGuardia Link buses contain a wave pattern in various shades of teal and blue, with plus signs and the SBS logo on the front of the bus.

All SBS buses display +Select Bus in the destination sign. Bus stops where SBS buses stop are also identifiable with the SBS branding on the glass shelters, and machines for MetroCard and coin payment in or near the shelters (except for the S79 SBS, which does not employ off-board fare collection). In addition, all buses on the SBS services employ all-door boarding operation, in which each set of doors open simultaneously for easier boarding and alighting, with the exception of the S79 which does not employ all-door boarding.

Upon the debut of Select Bus Service, blue flashing lights on both sides of the destination sign were used to help designate SBS buses from local buses (which have orange lights). While some, including bus operators, claimed the flashing blue lights helped improve travel times for buses, they were controversial due to some drivers mistaking them for emergency vehicles. The use of the lights also violated the New York State Vehicle and Traffic Law (Article 9, Section 375 (41)).  NYS Law states "The use of blue lights on vehicles shall be restricted for use only by a volunteer firefighter" and "may be affixed to a police vehicle and fire vehicle, provided that such blue light or lights shall be displayed on a police vehicle and fire vehicle for rear projection only." The lights were removed from service on January 18, 2013.

To replace the lights, in July 2015 the MTA began overhauling the front destination signs of buses to display the route in a blue background, as well as a completely blue background that flashes twice when it says +Select Bus (formerly it read +Select Bus Service). At night on some routes, the front destination sign is blue text on an unlit black background. Starting with the Q44 in November 2015, the blue background is kept when the front signage transitions to show the terminal of the route and the main streets traveled. As of July 2017, the SBS fleet on all routes have had their front destination signs overhauled, and new routes that launched after December 2015 came with the new destination signs.

In December 2019, the MTA unveiled its first 15 fully electric articulated buses, the XE60 fleet by New Flyer Industries, which now operate on various Michael J. Quill Depot SBS routes.

As of December 2022, all SBS routes use 60-foot articulated buses except the B82 and S79.

See also 
 MTA Regional Bus Operations
 Bus rapid transit

References

External links 

 
 MTA Planning website
 nyc.gov website

 
Transportation in New York City
Bus rapid transit in New York (state)
2008 establishments in New York City
SBS